Muslim Town Flyover (Punjabi, Shahrak-e-Musalmaan Sar Pul) is a flyover and interchange between Ferozepur Road, Wahdat Road and Canal Bank Road in Lahore, Pakistan.

References 

Bridges in Pakistan
Road interchanges in Pakistan
Streets in Lahore